"I Heard You're Married" is a song by Canadian singer the Weeknd featuring American rapper Lil Wayne. It was released as the fourteenth track on the former's fifth studio album, Dawn FM, on January 7, 2022. A synth- and electro-funk track, the two artists wrote the song with producers Calvin Harris and Oneohtrix Point Never with more production credits going to the Weeknd, Max Martin, and Oscar Holter. It is the second collaboration between the Weeknd and Lil Wayne, following their collaboration on the song "I'm Good" from the latter's mixtape, Dedication 5 (2013). The song was met with generally positive reviews, with praise for its production and the Weeknd's vocals.

Background and promotion
The song's name was first revealed on January 5, 2022, when Canadian singer the Weeknd posted the track listing for the song's parent album Dawn FM (2022).

It was originally set to be sent to US rhythmic contemporary radio through XO and Republic Records on January 11, 2022, as the third single from the album until its release was canceled, with "Sacrifice", the second single of Dawn FM, being sent instead.

Lyrics and composition
"I Heard You're Married" has been described as a synth-pop track where the Weeknd and Lil Wayne sing about the experience of being a side lover to a partner that is already married. The song runs for a duration of four minutes and twenty-four seconds.

Critical reception  
"I Heard You're Married" has received generally positive reviews. Some critics noted the song as a highlight on the record, with particular praise being given to the song's production. Mankaprr Conteh from Rolling Stone drew comparisons to Prince, saying the song's "smooth groove and splashy percussion" reminded him of the musical icon.

Charts

References

External links
 
 

2022 songs
Canadian synth-pop songs
Electro songs
Songs about marriage
Songs written by the Weeknd
The Weeknd songs
Song recordings produced by the Weeknd
Lil Wayne songs
Songs written by Lil Wayne
Songs written by Oneohtrix Point Never
Songs written by Calvin Harris
Song recordings produced by Oscar Holter
Song recordings produced by Max Martin